A rhinophore is one of a pair of chemosensory club-shaped, rod-shaped or ear-like structures which are the most prominent part of the external head anatomy in sea slugs, marine gastropod opisthobranch mollusks such as the nudibranchs, sea hares (Aplysiomorpha), and sap-sucking sea slugs (Sacoglossa).

Etymology 
The name relates to the rhinophore's function as an organ of "smell". Rhino- means nose from Ancient Greek ῥίς rhis and from its genitive ῥινός rhinos. "Phore" means "to bear" from New Latin -phorus and from Greek -phoros (φορος) "bearing", a derivative of phérein (φέρειν).

Function 

Rhinophores are scent or taste receptors, also known as chemosensory organs situated on the dorsal surface of the head. They are primarily used for distance chemoreception and rheoreception (response to water current).

The "scents" detected by rhinophores are chemicals dissolved in the sea water. The fine structure and hairs of the rhinophore provide a large surface area so that chemical detection is maximized. This allows the nudibranchs to stay close to their food source (for example species of sponges) and to find mates. In the sea hare Aplysia californica, the rhinophores are able to detect pheromones.

Protection 
To protect the prominent rhinophores against nibbling by predators, including fish, most species of dorid nudibranchs are able to withdraw their rhinophores into a pocket beneath the skin.

Structure 

In reproductively mature Aplysia adults, the rhinophore is about 1 cm in length. The neuroanatomical organization includes a rhinophore groove where most of the sensory cells appear to be concentrated. Its sensory epithelium contains sensory neurons that project axons back to rhinophore ganglia and dendrites that end in either a surface-exposed cilium or a small protuberance.

Comparison with oral tentacles 
In A. californica, the oral tentacles, which are situated in a more ventral position, are possibly involved in contact chemoreception and mechanoreception.

References
This article incorporates CC-BY-2.0 text (but not under GFDL) from reference.

Further reading 
 Wertz A., Rössler W., Obermayer M. & Bickmeyer U. (6 April 2006) "Functional neuroanatomy of the rhinophore of Aplysia punctata". Frontiers in Zoology 3: 6. 

Gastropod anatomy